Saylor is a surname. Notable people with the surname include:

 Bruce Saylor, American composer
 John P. Saylor (1908–1973), American politician
 Lynn Carey Saylor, American musician
 Michael J. Saylor (born 1965), CEO of MicroStrategy
 The Saylor Foundation, a free online university
Morgan Saylor, American actress
 Steven Saylor, (born 1956), American author
 Connie Saylor, (1940-1993) NASCAR driver from Johnson City Tennessee

See also
 Sailer (disambiguation)
 Sailor (disambiguation)
 Saylor, Iowa